Glenniea is a genus of plant in the family Sapindaceae.

Species
Plants of the World Online currently includes:
 Glenniea adami (Fouilloy) Leenh.
 Glenniea africana (Radlk.) Leenh.
 Glenniea penangensis (Ridl.) Leenh.
 Glenniea pervillei (Baill.) Leenh.
 Glenniea philippinensis (Radlk.) Leenh.
 Glenniea thorelii (Pierre) Leenh.
 Glenniea unijuga (Thwaites) Radlk.
 Glenniea unijugata (Aubrév. & Pellegr.) Leenh.

References

External links

 
Sapindaceae genera
Taxonomy articles created by Polbot
Taxa named by Joseph Dalton Hooker